Hatvan– Fiľakovo railway is a non-electrified railway connecting Hatvan, Hungary with Fiľakovo, Slovakia. Once a major connecting railway, the line currently sees only local Regionalbahn service and local goods traffic. It is double tracked from Hatvan to Selyp, then single tracked for the remainder of the distance to Fiľakovo. It is a class III passenger and goods line from Somoskőújfalu to Selyp, then becomes a class II line from there to Hatvan.  The line has utilized clock-face scheduling operation since 2008, when direct express train connecting service with Budapest ended.

The Hungarian portion is designated as line 81 and the Slovakian portion is line 164.

History of the line

The plans 
The idea for the line arose when coal mines were opened in Nógrád County. János Bellich, an engineer of the state-owned railway company made a proposal for a horsecar route between Salgótarján and Balassagyarmat. He worked together with Winsteig Gerog, an owner of a stone-pit from Wien. At the same time Brelleich proposed the creation of a steam railway line as well. At the end the idea was modified, as Brellich wanted to build the line to Hatvan.

Beginning of the construction 
On 19 January 1863 license was issued for the building of the railway line between Pest and  Besztercebánya. Construction was made with the involvement of the Hungarian Northern Railways.  The railway was planned to have 14 stations and 65 sentry boxes. Primary plans included a 700 m long tunnel on the line between Salgótarján and Somoskőújfalu, but the tunnel proposal was dropped when work began on this portion in 1871.

There were some prestigious people working on the line, for example Lajos Tolnai, first chief officer of the MÁV.

Handover 
First part of the line (from Pest to Salgótarján-József station) was handed over on 19 May 1867. First railway used the line on the same day through the 126 km long rail from Losoncz Railway Station.

Hungarian Northern Railway went bankrupt in 1868, and the line was transferred to the newly founded MÁV. Second part of the line between Salgótarján and Losonc via József station was handed over in 1871. It was a one-way track line.

There has not been station in Salgótrján. The nearest one was in Pálfalván. The station of the city was opened in this year.

Around World War II 
The railway was mostly used during the 1930s as a consequence of the rising demand for the mining. Most of the stations (for example Selyp) had industrial lines or there was coal sorter there.

World War II was the end of the prosperous line, because Germany destroyed the two-track line. Soviet army arriving to Hungary made the line fully renovated by the local citizens.

From the end of the war 
There was heavy traffic on the line during the 1980s. Several international trains used the line. Most well-known was the Polonia Express between Warsaw and Beograd via Budapest. The train operated up to the beginning of 1990. It used the line from Hatvan to reach and cross the border between Hungary and Slovakia.

During this period there were some direct trains to and from the capital and there were direct connection through wagons to Debrecen as well. In this period there was direct rail connection between Salgótarján and Kál Kápolna, and Mátranovák.

There was less frequent traffic during the 1990s, but there were numerous international expresses on the line yet. Some of these were Salgó, Bem or Ulpin. There were domestic express trains and direct connection between Hatvan and Losonc.

The timetable was thinned during the 2000s as well. Some express trains were left in the timetable, e.g. Sajó and Urpin. Last of them, the Urpin was cancelled in 2008. There were for example 2 international express trains, 13 pairs of express trains and direct connections with express trains between Hatvan and Salgótarján and direct regional trains between Hatvan and Losonc in the early morning and late afternoon or early evening hours.

Engineering facts

Vehicles 
The Belgian Cockerill’s stocks were the first on the railway. They ran as long as the 1920s. It was changed to MÁV Class 424 and later to MÁV Class 411 series. In the 1980s there came the first diesel engine locomotives, such as MÁV Class M40 and MÁV Class M62 series. They were used for passenger and freight trains respectively. There was a time when there ran some MÁV Class M41 trains as well.

Since the change of the timetable in 2008, there run MÁV Class 6341 units on the line, which belong to the Engineering Office of Szentes. MÁV Class M62 locomotives are used for freight transport, and MÁV Class M41s were moved to the Southern Great Plain.

Signalling control 
There are several types of signalling controls at the line. Domino55, a production of Telephone Factorz of Budapest based on the license of Integra and Siemens is in use between Selyp and Hatvan, but it may be found at Salgótarján-külső and Somoskőújfalu as well. Here guards are changed automatically, and traffic lights are guarded ones.

At Apc-Zagyvaszántó, Pásztó, Nagybátony and Kisterenye station guards are Siemens & Halske type. Railroad switches are turned through a pulling line traffic lights are insured signers.

At stations of Szurdokpüspöki, Tar and Zagyvapálfalva railroad switch positions are changed at the place.

Attractions near the line 
 There was a roundhouse from 1911, the period of steam locomotives. It was one of the buildings demolished in December 2008. Other ones were at Mátraszőlős-Hasznos, Mátraverebély and Vizslás.
 Castle of Somoskő and Salgó
 Old part of Hollókő, part of World Heritage Sites is near to the station at Pásztó.
 Water storage at Hasznos is located between Mátraszőlős-Hasznos and Pásztó.
 Gyürky-Solymossy Castle is not so far from the station of Kisternye.

Images

References

External links 

 81-es vasútvonal – Vasutallomasok.hu
 VPE–TAKT adatbázis

Railway lines in Hungary
Railway lines in Slovakia